Öncəqala (also, Ondzhakyala and Ondzha-Kelya) is a village and municipality in the Masally Rayon of Azerbaijan.  It has a population of 1,898.

References 

Populated places in Masally District